Sir William Amcotts-Ingilby, 2nd Baronet (June 1783 – 14 May 1854) was a British politician.

The son of Sir John Ingilby, 1st Baronet and his wife Elizabeth Amcotts, he entered the House of Commons as Member of Parliament (MP) for East Retford in 1807. In the same year, he succeeded his maternal grandfather, Sir Wharton Amcotts, 1st Baronet, in his baronetcy by special remainder.

Ingilby left Parliament in 1812, and succeeded his father as baronet in 1815, inheriting Ripley Castle in Yorkshire and Kettlethorpe Hall in Lincolnshire. He served as High Sheriff of Yorkshire in 1821, and assumed the surname of Amcotts-Ingilby in 1822. He returned to Parliament at an 1823 by-election, as MP for Lincolnshire. He held that seat until the abolition of the constituency in 1832, and he then sat for North Lincolnshire until defeated in the 1835 election.

Amcotts-Ingilby, a very eccentric character, was twice married, but left no children; his baronetcies became extinct upon his death on 14 May 1854, at 23 Abingdon St, Westminster. His second marriage was to Mary Anne Clementson, daughter of John Clementson, and Lady Ingilby died after almost 50 years his widow at Broxholme, Ripley, Yorkshire, in her 85th year, on 22 December 1902. His estates were left by devise to his first cousin, Henry John Ingilby. His sister, Augusta Amcotts-Ingilby, was the mother of Weston Cracroft Amcotts.

References

External links 
 

|-

1783 births
1854 deaths
Baronets in the Baronetage of Great Britain
High Sheriffs of Yorkshire
Members of the Parliament of the United Kingdom for English constituencies
UK MPs 1807–1812
UK MPs 1820–1826
UK MPs 1826–1830
UK MPs 1830–1831
UK MPs 1831–1832
UK MPs 1832–1835
Ingilby family